The Aura is a  tributary of the Sinn River in Bavaria, Germany.

Name
The name Aura originates from the Old High German Uraha. The word ur meant Aurochs, and the word aha meant stream, meaning it was a river where Aurochs lived. The river gives the Gemeinde Aura im Sinngrund its name.

Course
In Fellen, it meets its largest tributary, the Fellach. At its mouth, the Aura then turns to the east. The mouth of the river is in Burgsinn, where it flows into the Flutgraben, an anabranch of the Sinn

See also
List of rivers of Bavaria

References

Rivers of Bavaria
Rivers of the Spessart
Rivers of Germany